The Austria women's national 3x3 team is a national basketball team of Austria, administered by the Basketball Austria. It represents the country in international 3x3 (3 against 3) women's basketball competitions.

World Cup record

See also
Austria women's national basketball team

References

External links

3
Women's national 3x3 basketball teams